Mykal Reginald Riley (born July 14, 1985) is an American professional basketball player, who lastly played for Bursaspor of the Turkish Super League. Standing at 1.98 m (6'6"), he plays the small forward position.

He is best known for his last-second three-point shot against Mississippi State in the 2008 SEC men's basketball tournament (he was named to the All-Tournament Team): the shot extended the game into overtime, possibly preventing thousands of fans from walking out of the Georgia Dome at the time a tornado struck the area.

References

1985 births
Living people
Alabama Crimson Tide men's basketball players
American expatriate basketball people in France
American expatriate basketball people in Italy
American expatriate basketball people in Venezuela
American men's basketball players
Basketball players from Arkansas
Bucaneros de La Guaira players
Bursaspor Basketbol players
Élan Chalon players
JDA Dijon Basket players
Junior college men's basketball players in the United States
Le Mans Sarthe Basket players
Nanterre 92 players
Panola College alumni
Small forwards
Sportspeople from Pine Bluff, Arkansas